Chandroth Kalyadan Bhaskaran (5 May 194121 November 2020) was an Indian former first-class cricketer who played for Kerala and Madras. He represented India in an unofficial Test match against Ceylon in 1965. He was regarded as "one of the country's leading fast bowlers in the sixties."

Life and career
Born in Tellicherry (now Thalassery), Bhaskaran played as a right-arm medium-fast swing bowler. He made his first-class debut for Kerala in December 1957 at the age of 16. In January 1965, he played for India in an unofficial Test match against Ceylon at Ahmedabad. Bhaskaran switched to Madras during his later career, and was part of the Madras team that finished runners-up in the 1967–68 Ranji Trophy. In the final against Bombay, he scored 76 not out in the first innings and took 4/68 in Bombay's first innings. He appeared in a total of 42 first-class matches and took 106 wickets.

Bhaskaran worked as a doctor in Houston after his playing career, specializing in sports medicine, and treated several professional athletes from different nations. In 2006, he started the "Mission Gold for India" company to train Indian athletes for the Olympic Games.

Bhaskaran's brother C. K. Vijayan also played first-class cricket for Kerala.

He died on 21 November 2020 in Houston at the age of 79.

References

External links 
 
 

1941 births
2020 deaths
Indian cricketers
Kerala cricketers
Tamil Nadu cricketers
South Zone cricketers
Indian Universities cricketers
People from Thalassery
Cricketers from Kerala